Gurmeet Singh Chahal (born 3 December 1999) is an Indian professional footballer who plays as a goalkeeper for Indian Super League club Hyderabad.

Club career
Singh made his professional debut for Indian Super League side NorthEast United on 1 March 2019 against Kerala Blasters. He came on as a 71st minute substitute for the injured Pawan Kumar as NorthEast United drew the match 0–0. On 30 July 2021, Singh joined Hyderabad on a three-year deal.

Career statistics

Club

Honours
Hyderabad
Indian Super League: 2021–22

References

External links
Profile at the NorthEast United FC website

1999 births
Living people
Indian footballers
Association football goalkeepers
NorthEast United FC players
Indian Super League players
Hyderabad FC players